OOV may refer to:

 Oov, a dialect of the Mutu language
 Our Own Voice Literary Journal: Beyond Homeland (OOV), a Philippine literary journal
 out of vision (OOV), see Glossary of broadcasting terms
 Out of vocabulary (OOV), words not found in the internal dictionaries 
 in statistical machine translation
 in audio mining
 Officer of the Order of Volta (O.O.V.), see List of abbreviations in Ghana

See also

 112 (emergency telephone number), for the Openbare Orde en Veiligheid (OOV) in the Netherlands

 O2V (disambiguation) 

 OVV (disambiguation)
 OV (disambiguation)